Servant of the Mind is the eighth studio album by Danish rock band Volbeat. The album was released on 3 December 2021 through Vertigo, Republic, and Universal Records. The album was preceded by four singles: "Wait a Minute My Girl", "Dagen Før" (featuring Stine Bramsen), "Shotgun Blues", and "Becoming". The album marks a return to a heavier sound in comparison to their previous album, Rewind, Replay, Rebound. 

Like Volbeat's previous albums, it was produced by Jacob Hansen and Michael Poulsen. It was recorded at Hansen Studios (Ribe, Denmark) and Sonic Debris Studio (West Babylon, New York) during the COVID-19 pandemic.

Background and recording
The band had a tour in North American planned for April and May 2020 with the opening acts Clutch and The Picturebooks which had to be canceled due to the COVID-19 pandemic. According to bassist Kaspar Boye Larsen, the band used this time to write new songs, as the musicians couldn't do anything else. The album took three months to write. In an interview with "Whiplash", the KLOS radio show hosted by Full Metal Jackie, lead vocalist Michael Poulsen stated:

The band recorded a cover of Metallica's "Don't Tread on Me" for the charity tribute album The Metallica Blacklist, released in September 2021. The album was mainly recorded at Hansen Studios in Ribe, Denmark. Rob Caggiano recorded the lead guitars at Sonic Debris Studio in West Babylon, New York.

Release and promotion
On 2 June 2021, the songs "Wait a Minute My Girl" and "Dagen Før" (featuring Alphabeat's Stine Bramsen) debuted as the first two of four singles before the album's 3 December release. "Wait a Minute My Girl" became the band's ninth number one single on the Billboard Mainstream Rock chart. On 23 September 2021, the third single, "Shotgun Blues" was released. On the same day, the band confirmed the release of their eighth studio album Servant of the Mind for 3 December 2021. In September 2021, the band announced a 2022 co-headline with Ghost. On 28 October 2021, the band released the fourth single from their new album, "Becoming". On 11 November 2021, a music video was released for "Shotgun Blues". On 3 December 2021, the same day of the album's release, the band released a lyric video for "Temple of Ekur". On 13 April 2022, the band released an official music video for the same song. The band is set to start the Servant of the Road 2022 Tour on 21 May 2022.

Composition and themes
Servant of the Mind has been described as hard rock, heavy metal, psychobilly, rockabilly, and rock and roll. According to AllMusic, "Servant of the Mind is arguably the darkest, loudest, and heaviest album in their catalog --as well as their most accessible." The album has been compared to Metallica and contains elements of thrash metal. The opener "Temple of Ekur" has ancient themes similar to one of the band's previous songs, "The Gates of Babylon" off Seal the Deal & Let's Boogie (2016). "Wait a Minute My Girl" is an upbeat song that utilizes saxophones and pianos. The guitar riffs on "The Sacred Stones" are reminscent of Black Sabbath. The song is about "an earthly being who has committed himself to the dark side." "Shotgun Blues" has been called "classic Volbeat." The Devil Rages On" has been described as "underworld psychobilly". The song is about is about "the devil taking human form". The song is about Poulsen's experience with ghosts. "Dagen Før" featuring Alphabeat vocalist Stine Bramsen has a "pop-rock sensibility." "The Passenger" utilizes "punky '80s thrash" in the verses and "pop-metal" in the refrain, "Step Into Light" contains "twangy guitar[s], "post-punk menace", and elements of psychedelia. "Say No More" and "Becoming" have been compared to Metallica's Hardwired... to Self-Destruct. "Becoming" also contains "nods at death metal". The song "Lasse's Birgitta" has been described as thrash metal and progressive rock. The song is about Sweden’s first witch burnings in 1471.

Critical reception 

Servant of the Mind received generally positive reviews from critics. Thom Jurek of AllMusic described the album as "wonderfully crafted" and "beautifully recorded." Dom Lawson of Blabbermouth.net called the album their "most complete record yet." Malcolm Dome of Classic Rock was positive towards the album stating, "The whole album shines and flows with a real sense of purpose, and you know that not only did they have fun putting this all together, but also they achieved it with the attention to detail that marks it out as a firm step forward for the band." 

Jack Press of Distorted Sound was a little less positive stating "When Volbeat stick to what they know, they sound more vital than ever. However, their moments of mutation on Servants Of The Mind sound like a blockbuster band running out of steam." Steve Beebee of Kerrang! considered the album to be a "beefed-up career high" and was positive towards the guitar work from Michael Poulsen and Rob Caggiano. Chad Bowar of Metal Injection stated that "Servant of the Mind has a lot of memorable songs, a couple of filler tracks, and follows in the path of Rewind, Replay, Rebound and 2016's Seal the Deal & Let's Boogie with catchy hard rock singles augmented by some metal moments."

Track listing

Personnel
Credits adapted from the booklet of Servant of the Mind.

Volbeat
 Michael Poulsen – vocals, rhythm guitar, producer
 Jon Larsen – drums
 Rob Caggiano – lead guitar, recording, engineer
 Kaspar Boye Larsen – bass

Additional musicians
 Doug Corcoran	– saxophone (track 2)
 Stine Bramsen – guest vocals (track 8)
 Mia Maja – backing vocals (tracks 1, 2, 9, 10, 12)
 Ray Jacildo – piano (track 2)
 Martin Pagaard Wolff – acoustic and additional electric guitars (track 8)

Production
 Jacob Hansen – producer, mixing, mastering, recording, engineer
 Tue Bayer	– instrument technician
 Jerry Carillo	– guitar technician

Imagery
 Ross Halfin – band photo
 Karsten Sand – illustrations
 Henrik Siegel	– graphic design
 Frode Sylthe	– cover photo

Charts

Weekly charts

Year-end charts

References 

2021 albums
Volbeat albums
Republic Records albums
Vertigo Records albums
Universal Records albums
Albums produced by Jacob Hansen